Ed Miliband became Leader of the Labour Party and Leader of the Opposition upon being elected to the former post on 25 September 2010. The election was triggered by Gordon Brown's resignation following the party's fall from power at the 2010 general election, which yielded a Conservative–Liberal Democrat Coalition. Miliband appointed his first Shadow Cabinet in October 2010, following the Labour Party  Shadow Cabinet elections. These elections were the last such elections before they were abolished in 2011.

Miliband conducted two major reshuffles in 2011 and 2013, with a number of minor changes throughout his term.

Following the 2015 general election and Miliband's resignation, acting leader Harriet Harman announced a new shadow cabinet to last until the election of a new party leader in September 2015.

Shadow Cabinet from 2010 to 2015

Initial Shadow Cabinet
Miliband announced his first Shadow Cabinet on 8 October 2010 following the 2010 Shadow Cabinet elections. Under the party rules, as amended in 2010, the Shadow Cabinet comprised the Leader, the Deputy Leader, the Leader of the Labour Peers, the Chief Whips in both houses, and 19 MPs elected by the Parliamentary Labour Party.

 Ed Miliband – Leader of Her Majesty's Most Loyal Opposition and Leader of the Labour Party
 Harriet Harman – Shadow Deputy Prime Minister, Deputy Leader of the Opposition, Deputy Leader of the Labour Party and Shadow Secretary of State for International Development
 Alan Johnson – Shadow Chancellor of the Exchequer
 Yvette Cooper – Shadow Foreign Secretary and Shadow Minister for Women and Equalities
 Ed Balls – Shadow Home Secretary
 Rosie Winterton – Opposition Chief Whip in the House of Commons
 Andy Burnham – Shadow Secretary of State for Education and Election Coordinator
 Sadiq Khan – Shadow Lord Chancellor and Shadow Secretary of State for Justice (with responsibility for political and constitutional reform)
 Liam Byrne – Shadow Secretary of State for Work and Pensions
 John Denham – Shadow Secretary of State for Business, Innovation and Skills
 John Healey – Shadow Secretary of State for Health
 Caroline Flint – Shadow Secretary of State for Communities and Local Government
 Jim Murphy – Shadow Secretary of State for Defence
 Meg Hillier – Shadow Secretary of State for Energy and Climate Change
 Hilary Benn – Shadow Leader of the House of Commons and Shadow Lord Privy Seal
 Maria Eagle – Shadow Secretary of State for Transport
 Mary Creagh – Shadow Secretary of State for Environment, Food and Rural Affairs
 Angela Eagle – Shadow Chief Secretary to the Treasury
 Shaun Woodward – Shadow Secretary of State for Northern Ireland
 Ann McKechin – Shadow Secretary of State for Scotland
 Peter Hain – Shadow Secretary of State for Wales
 Ivan Lewis – Shadow Secretary of State for Culture, Media and Sport
 Janet Baroness Royall of Blaisdon – Leader of the Opposition in the House of Lords
 Liam Byrne – Shadow Minister for the Cabinet Office
 Tessa Jowell – Shadow Minister for the Olympics
 Steve Lord Bassam of Brighton – Opposition Chief Whip in the House of Lords
 Patricia Scotland – Shadow Attorney General

Also attending Shadow Cabinet meetings:
 Jon Trickett – Shadow Minister of State for the Cabinet Office

Subsequent changes 
 20 January 2011: Johnson resigned as Shadow Chancellor and was replaced by Ed Balls, who was replaced by Cooper as Shadow Home Secretary. She (while remaining Shadow Equalities Minister) was succeeded as Shadow Foreign Secretary by Alexander, whom Byrne replaced as Shadow Work and Pensions Secretary. Jowell took Byrne's role as Shadow Minister for the Cabinet Office, while retaining her role as Shadow Olympics Minister.

2011 reshuffle
On 7 October 2011, Miliband conducted a major reshuffle of his Shadow Cabinet. This followed the Labour Party Conference at which delegates voted to allow the party leader to choose the membership of the Shadow Cabinet, eliminating elections by MPs. Healey chose to stand down from frontline politics and was replaced as Shadow Health Secretary by Andy Burnham, whose Education portfolio went to Stephen Twigg, a newcomer to the Shadow Cabinet, and whose responsibilities as Election Co-ordinator went to Tom Watson, also new to the Shadow Cabinet and who also was given the title "Deputy Chair of the Labour Party". Denham chose to stand down from the Business portfolio, becoming Miliband's Parliamentary Private Secretary. He was replaced by new Shadow Minister of State for Small Business, Chuka Umunna.

Harman and Lewis swapped substantive portfolios (International Development to Lewis and Culture to Harman). Trickett took primary responsibility for shadowing the Cabinet Office from Jowell. The latter retained her position in the Shadow Cabinet as well as her roles as Shadow Minister for London and for the Olympics. Woodward (Northern Ireland) and McKechin (Scotland) were both left out of the Shadow Cabinet, being replaced by newcomers: Vernon Coaker and Margaret Curran, respectively.

Hillier left the Shadow Cabinet, and was replaced at the Energy portfolio by Flint. She was in turn replaced at Communities and Local Government by Benn, whose role as Shadow Leader of the House went to Angela Eagle. She was replaced as Shadow Chief Secretary to the Treasury by Rachel Reeves, who was new to the Shadow Cabinet. Hain retained his responsibilities and was named Chair of the National Policy Forum. Byrne likewise retained his portfolio and added "Policy Review Co-ordinator", reflecting work he had already taken on.

Additionally, Emily Thornberry replaced Patricia Scotland as Shadow Attorney General, with the right to attend Shadow Cabinet, but not full membership. Three others obtained the right to attend Shadow Cabinet: Stewart Lord Wood of Anfield retained his role as a Shadow Minister without Portfolio on the Shadow Cabinet Office team (i.e., the Opposition equivalent of the Cabinet Office). Michael Dugher also became a Shadow Minister without Portfolio with the right to attend Shadow Cabinet meetings. Liz Kendall was appointed Shadow Minister for Care and Older People with the right to attend Shadow Cabinet.

Finally, the Shadow Cabinet list announced on the day of the reshuffle did not note Khan, the Shadow Justice Secretary, as having "responsibility for political and constitutional reform" as it previously had. It is not clear whether he retained this responsibility or it transferred to Harman, whose title has been listed as "Shadow Deputy Prime Minister" instead of "Deputy Leader of the Opposition"; Nick Clegg, the Deputy Prime Minister, was the Government minister with responsibility for political and constitutional reform.

 Ed Miliband – Leader of Her Majesty's Most Loyal Opposition and Leader of the Labour Party
 Harriet Harman – Shadow Deputy Prime Minister, Deputy Leader of the Opposition, Shadow Secretary of State for Culture, Media and Sport, Deputy Leader of the Labour Party and Labour Party Chair
 Ed Balls – Shadow Chancellor of the Exchequer
 Douglas Alexander – Shadow Foreign Secretary
 Yvette Cooper – Shadow Home Secretary and Shadow Minister for Women and Equalities
 Sadiq Khan – Shadow Lord Chancellor and Shadow Secretary of State for Justice
 Rosie Winterton – Opposition Chief Whip in the House of Commons
 Andy Burnham – Shadow Secretary of State for Health
 Stephen Twigg – Shadow Secretary of State for Education
 Chuka Umunna – Shadow Secretary of State for Business, Innovation and Skills
 Jim Murphy – Shadow Secretary of State for Defence
 Hilary Benn – Shadow Secretary of State for Communities and Local Government
 Angela Eagle – Shadow Leader of the House of Commons
 Rachel Reeves – Shadow Chief Secretary to the Treasury
 Caroline Flint – Shadow Secretary of State for Energy and Climate Change
 Tessa Jowell – Shadow Minister for London and Shadow Minister for the Olympics
 Maria Eagle – Shadow Secretary of State for Transport
 Liam Byrne – Shadow Secretary of State for Work and Pensions and Policy Review Co-ordinator
 Ivan Lewis – Shadow Secretary of State for International Development
 Mary Creagh – Shadow Secretary of State for Environment, Food and Rural Affairs
 Jon Trickett – Shadow Minister for the Cabinet Office
 Tom Watson – Deputy Chair of the Labour Party and Campaign Coordinator
 Vernon Coaker – Shadow Secretary of State for Northern Ireland
 Margaret Curran – Shadow Secretary of State for Scotland
 Peter Hain – Shadow Secretary of State for Wales and Chair of the National Policy Forum
 Janet Baroness Royall of Blaisdon – Leader of the Opposition in the House of Lords
 Steve Lord Bassam of Brighton – Opposition Chief Whip in the House of Lords

Also attending Shadow Cabinet meetings:
 Liz Kendall – Shadow Minister for Care and Older People
 Michael Dugher – Shadow Minister without Portfolio
 Emily Thornberry – Shadow Attorney General
 Stewart Lord Wood of Anfield – Shadow Minister without Portfolio

Subsequent changes 
 On 15 May 2012, following the resignation of Peter Hain as Shadow Welsh Secretary, Miliband conducted a mini-reshuffle: Owen Smith was appointed to replace Hain, while Jon Cruddas replaced Liam Byrne as Policy Review Co-ordinator.
 On 11 September 2012, Dame Tessa Jowell left the shadow cabinet, after saying she planned to retire from frontline politics.

2013 reshuffle
On 7 October 2013, Ed Miliband carried out a reshuffle of his front bench team. The moves included demotions of prominent Blairites including Jim Murphy, who went from Defence to International Development, and Ivan Lewis who moved from International Development to the shadow Northern Ireland portfolio. Also, Liam Byrne and Stephen Twigg moved respectively from Work and Pensions and from Education to junior shadow ministerial positions at Business and Education. Prominent promotions included Tristram Hunt to Education, Rachel Reeves to Work and Pensions, Vernon Coaker to Defence, and Chris Leslie to Shadow Chief Secretary to the Treasury. Douglas Alexander was appointed Chair of General Election Strategy and Planning.

 Ed Miliband – Leader of Her Majesty's Most Loyal Opposition and Leader of the Labour Party
 Harriet Harman – Shadow Deputy Prime Minister, Deputy Leader of the Opposition, Shadow Secretary of State for Culture, Media and Sport, Deputy Leader of the Labour Party and Labour Party Chair
 Ed Balls – Shadow Chancellor of the Exchequer
 Douglas Alexander – Shadow Foreign Secretary and Chair of the General Election Strategy and Planning
 Yvette Cooper – Shadow Home Secretary and Shadow Minister for Women and Equalities
 Sadiq Khan – Shadow Lord Chancellor and Shadow Secretary of State for Justice
 Rosie Winterton – Opposition Chief Whip in the House of Commons
 Andy Burnham – Shadow Secretary of State for Health
 Tristram Hunt – Shadow Secretary of State for Education
 Chuka Umunna – Shadow Secretary of State for Business, Innovation and Skills
 Vernon Coaker – Shadow Secretary of State for Defence
 Jim Murphy – Shadow Secretary of State for International Development
 Hilary Benn – Shadow Secretary of State for Communities and Local Government
 Angela Eagle – Shadow Leader of the House of Commons
 Rachel Reeves – Shadow Secretary of State for Work and Pensions
 Caroline Flint – Shadow Secretary of State for Energy and Climate Change
 Mary Creagh – Shadow Secretary of State for Transport
 Maria Eagle – Shadow Secretary of State for Environment, Food and Rural Affairs
 Chris Leslie – Shadow Chief Secretary to the Treasury
 Margaret Curran – Shadow Secretary of State for Scotland
 Ivan Lewis – Shadow Secretary of State for Northern Ireland
 Owen Smith – Shadow Secretary of State for Wales
 Gloria De Piero – Shadow Minister for Women and Equalities
 Michael Dugher – Shadow Minister for the Cabinet Office and Head of Communications
 Jon Trickett – Shadow Minister without Portfolio and Deputy Party Chair
 Janet Baroness Royall of Blaisdon – Shadow Leader of the House of Lords

Also attending Shadow Cabinet meetings:
 Emma Reynolds – Shadow Minister for Housing
 Liz Kendall – Shadow Minister for Care and Older People
 Emily Thornberry – Shadow Attorney General
 Jon Cruddas – Chair of the Labour Party Policy Review
 Stewart Lord Wood of Anfield – Shadow Minister without Portfolio
 Steve Lord Bassam of Brighton – Labour Chief Whip in the House of Lords
 Glenis Willmott - Leader of the EPLP

Subsequent changes 
 On 2 November 2014, Jim Murphy resigned as Shadow International Development Secretary to campaign for the leadership of the Scottish Labour Party. Subsequently, on 5 November, a number of changes to the composition of the shadow cabinet were announced: Shadow Transport Secretary Mary Creagh replaced Murphy at International Development, who was replaced by Michael Dugher, hitherto the Shadow Minister for the Cabinet Office; he was in turn replaced by Lucy Powell.
 On 20 November 2014, Emily Thornberry resigned as Shadow Attorney General following a backlash resulting from her sending of a controversial tweet. Willy Lord Bach was named as her replacement on 3 December.

See also
 Official Opposition (United Kingdom)
 Official Opposition frontbench
 Cabinet of the United Kingdom
 British Government frontbench
 Liberal Democrat frontbench team
 Labour Party Shadow Cabinet election, 2010

References

External links

Ed Miliband
Miliband
Official Opposition (United Kingdom)
2010 establishments in the United Kingdom
British shadow cabinets
2010 in British politics
2015 disestablishments in the United Kingdom